Lauvaux is a French surname. Notable people with the surname include:

Gustave Lauvaux (1892–1970), French Olympic runner
Henri Lauvaux (1900–1970), French Olympic runner, brother of Gustave

See also
Constant Lavaux (1877–1961), Belgian wrestler

French-language surnames